Desitin may have several meanings:

 Desitin Ointment, a diaper rash ointment, mainly based on zinc oxide and cod liver oil
 Desitin Arzneimittel GmbH, a German pharmaceutical company